Dennis Agajanian is an American Christian musician of Armenian descent. who has recorded over 20 albums. Agajanian has played at churches around the world in 120 countries, having also been featured at the Harvest Crusades and Billy Graham's crusades since 1974.

Dennis is the recipient of multiple music awards: the Inspirational Country Music Association, Entertainer of the Year, and the Living Legend Award. Partnering with Samaritan's Purse, Dennis has been involved with Operation Christmas Child, delivering shoeboxes that have been filled with gifts from local church members to over 100 million children around the world in over 130 different countries.

Agajanian is a nephew of auto racing owner and promoter J. C. Agajanian.

References

External links
Dennis Agajanian – Official Site

American people of Armenian descent
American performers of Christian music
Living people
American bluegrass guitarists
American male guitarists
Year of birth missing (living people)